The Health Products and Food Branch (HPFB) of Health Canada manages the health-related risks and benefits of health products and food by minimizing risk factors while maximizing the safety provided by the regulatory system and providing information to Canadians so they can make healthy, informed decisions about their health.

HPFB has ten operational Directorates with direct regulatory responsibilities:

 Biologics and Genetic Therapies Directorate
 Food Directorate
 Marketed Health Products Directorate (with responsibility for post-market surveillance)
 Medical Devices Directorate
 Natural Health Products Directorate
 Office of Nutrition Policy and Promotion
 Pharmaceutical Drugs Directorate
 Policy, Planning and International Affairs Directorate
 Resource Management and Operations Directorate
 Veterinary Drugs Directorate

Extraordinary Use New Drugs
Extraordinary Use New Drugs (EUNDs) is a regulatory programme under which, in times of emergency, drugs can be granted regulatory approval under the Food and Drug Act and its regulations. An EUND approved through this pathway can only be sold to federal, provincial, territorial and municipal governments. The text of the EUNDs regulations is available.

On 25 March 2011 and after the pH1N1 pandemic, amendments were made to the Food and Drug Regulations (FDR) to include a specific regulatory pathway for EUNDs. Typically, clinical trials in human subjects are conducted and the results are provided as part of the clinical information package of a New Drug Submission (NDS) to Health Canada, the federal authority that reviews the safety and efficacy of human drugs.

Health Canada recognizes that there are circumstances in which sponsors cannot reasonably provide substantial evidence demonstrating the safety and efficacy of a therapeutic product for NDS as there are logistical or ethical challenges in conducting the appropriate human clinical trials. The EUND pathway was developed to allow a mechanism for authorization of these drugs based on non-clinical and limited clinical information. A manufacturer of a new drug may file an extraordinary use new drug submission for the new drug if, under paragraph C.08.002.01(1):

International agreements
The HPFB signed an electronic data interchange agreement with the US Food and Drug Administration in November 2003, and again in April 2004 with the Therapeutic Goods Administration of Australia. Dr Joel Lexchin found the secrecy arrangements in the Memorandum of Understanding to be troublesome and said that "that just makes it more difficult for the medical community to know how drugs were approved, how the data were assessed, and even what data were assessed."

In 2016, the HPFB signed an agreement with the European Directorate for the Quality of Medicines "for the exchange of information generated by the EDQM through its certification procedure and by HBFB during the course of applicable product assessments."

See also 
 List of food safety organisations
 Regulation of therapeutic goods

References

External links
Health Products & Food Branch

Health Canada

Food safety
Product testing
Drug control law
Drug safety
Life sciences industry
Pharmaceuticals policy